Arthur D'Arcy "Bobby" Locke (20 November 1917 – 9 March 1987) was a South African professional golfer. He is generally regarded as one of the greatest golfers of all time. He won The Open Championship four times and 15 PGA Tour events in total. In addition, he was a prolific tournament winner in South Africa, ultimately recording over 50 significant victories in his home country, including the South African Open nine times.

Biography

Early years
Locke was born in Germiston, South Africa the only son of Mr. C.J. and Mrs. O. Locke of 70 Nottingham Road, Kensington, Johannesburg. He obtained his Educational Junior Certificate pass at Benoni High School in 1934.

Early professional career
Locke won the South African Open for the first of nine times in 1935, at the Parkview Golf Club in Johannesburg, with a score of 296, playing as an amateur. He played in his first Open Championship in 1936, when he was eighteen, and finished as low amateur.

He turned professional in March 1938 at the age of 20 and was engaged by the Maccauvlei Country Club as club professional in December 1939. Problems arose when Locke wanted to give lessons to non-members as well as take leave of absence, without advance request, to take part in outside competitions such as the U.S. Open. Locke resigned from the club, by letter, on 26 July 1940.

Service in World War II
His golf career was interrupted by service in the South African Air Force during World War II. His Official War Record is held at the South African Department of Defence archives under his Service No: 103940.

Alternate descriptions of Locke's war record
Other descriptions of Locke's war record suggest he was more active than the transport duties he undertook, with SAAF Number 31 Squadron in Italy, that are described by the official SANDF archives. The descriptions include: he spent twelve months in a Liberator Squadron in Italy  he was a bomber pilot who bombed Monte Casino, he fought for Britain as a bomber pilot; he flew over 100 missions over Europe with the SAAF; and 'served with distinction as a Royal Airforce Bomber pilot'.
Locke also claims that:
 In a photograph of him and others, he was playing golf at Gizeh Golf & Country Club, in Cairo, in 1943, and
 "My stay in the Air Force lasted five years and three months, in which time I completed 1,800 hours on single-, twin- and four-engined aircraft"

Success in the United States
Following the end of World War II, Locke successfully resumed his career in South Africa in 1946. He hosted Sam Snead, one of the top American golfers of the day, for a series of exhibition matches in South Africa in January/February 1947, winning 12 out of the 16 matches, two were halved and Snead won two. So impressed was Snead that he suggested that Locke come to the United States and give the PGA Tour a try, advice that Locke quickly followed.

Locke arrived in the U.S. for the first time in April 1947, well after the American Tour season had begun. In two-and-a-half years on the PGA Tour, Locke played in 59 events; he won 11, and finished in the top three in 30, just over half. In 1947, despite a late start, Locke dominated the American tour, winning six tournaments (including four in a five-week period), and finishing second to Jimmy Demaret on the money list.

Controversy and PGA Tour ban
In 1948, he won the Chicago Victory National by 16 strokes, which remains a PGA Tour record for margin of victory (tied for margin of victory with J. Douglas Edgar's win in the 1919 Canadian Open).

The following year, Locke was banned from the tour, ostensibly because of a dispute over playing commitments. Locke had indeed given several advance commitments to appear at tournaments and exhibitions, then had not turned up nor given adequate notice nor explanations for his absences. However, the 1948 Masters champion Claude Harmon stated, unsolicited, to another golf personality during that era: "Locke was simply too good. They had to ban him." The ban was lifted in 1951, but Locke chose not to return to play in the United States, except for a few isolated appearances.

Locke explains his point of view and events leading up to the banning. He had accepted invitations, organised through the PGA to play in two local tournaments, The Inverness Fourball and Western Open. He explained how he had been helped to iron out a putting problem which led to him winning the 1949 British Open. He gives the "Open" win as one of his reasons to breach his contract. The text indicates that he understood the contractual nature of his dealings with the PGA.

Worldwide success
After leaving the PGA Tour, Locke continued his career in Europe and Africa, where he felt more comfortable. He won 23 times in Europe, most notably a quartet of successes in The Open Championship, which came in 1949, 1950, 1952 and 1957. He was the first of many South Africans who subsequently won major championships, including Gary Player, Ernie Els, Retief Goosen, Trevor Immelman, Louis Oosthuizen and Charl Schwartzel.  His win in the 1957 Open Championship was with some controversy.  Locke had failed to properly replace his ball after marking on the 72nd green, and proceeded to putt out.  This had been confirmed through newsreel footage provided to the Royal and Ancient after the trophy presentation. The rules at the time made no provision for a two shot penalty, thus Locke's win could have been overturned through disqualification.  However, the Championship committee did not enforce the disqualification rule, citing "equity and spirit of the game" as overriding factors in sustaining the posted result.

During this time Locke also played many other parts of the world. In 1955 he won the Australian Open held at Gailes Golf Club in Queensland; he later rated this as one of the best courses he had ever played. In 1959, Locke was involved in a serious car accident, and subsequently he suffered from migraines and eye problems that put an end to his competitive career, although he continued competing occasionally after that, without much success.

Locke was elected to the World Golf Hall of Fame in 1977. He was only the second member (after Gary Player) who did not come from either the United States or the United Kingdom. He died in Johannesburg, South Africa in 1987.

Playing attributes
Locke built his success around his outstanding putting ability, coining the phrase "You drive for show, but putt for dough." Wearing his trademark knickerbockers, white shoes, and stockings, Locke played the game at a slow and deliberate pace, perhaps another reason that American pros were annoyed with him. On the greens, Locke was a bona fide genius, using a very unusual putting style (he would bring the putter back far to the inside on the backstroke, then virtually "trap" the ball with a hooded, closed clubface on the forward stroke, imparting a tremendous amount of overspin), and a great eye for reading breaks, to put on veritable putting clinics every time he played. Locke believed he could put spin on putts (similar to full-swing shots) and make them "hook" and "slice", and used his unorthodox technique to great success.

Locke was not particularly long from the tee, but placed great emphasis on accuracy in hitting fairways and greens; he employed an extreme right-to-left ball flight (one that bordered on a hook) on nearly every full shot.

Australian contemporary pro Jim Ferrier, who played the U.S. Tour during the late 1940s with Locke, described Locke's putting method as being designed to overcome the very heavy grain present on many Bermuda-grass greens of that era, particularly in warm-climate regions such as South Africa and the southern United States. In these regions, greens had to be constructed during that era using Bermuda-grass turf in order to survive the extreme summer heat; turfgrass research eventually developed a wider variety of strains which could be used. Locke's putting method allowed the ball to glide on top of the grass without being affected very much by the grain. Ferrier explained that Locke had apparently learned the technique from an Englishman in Egypt, while he was stationed there during World War II. Locke had in fact learned the technique from Walter Hagen during the "Haigs" tour of South Africa with Joe Kirkwood in 1938.

Amateur wins
1931 South Africa Boys
1935 South African Amateur, Natal Amateur, Transvaal Amateur
1936 Natal Amateur, Lucifer Empire Trophy
1937 South African Amateur, Transvaal Amateur, Orange Free State Amateur

Professional wins (94)

PGA Tour wins (15)

PGA Tour playoff record (4–0)

South Africa wins (50)
1935 Natal Open, South African Open (both as an amateur)
1936 Natal Open (as an amateur)
1937 South African Open, Transvaal Open (both as an amateur)
1938 South African Open, South Africa Professional, Transvaal Open
1939 South African Open, South Africa Professional, Transvaal Open
1940 South African Open, South Africa Professional, Transvaal Open
1946 South African Open, South Africa Professional, Transvaal Open
1949 Stanley Motors 1,000 Guineas Tournament, Transvaal Open
1950 Dunlop £1.000 Tournament, Stanley Motors 1,000 Guineas Tournament, Transvaal Open, Western Transvaal Open, Grey Slax £1,000 Tournament, South Africa Professional, South African Open, Grey Slax £1,000 Tournament
1951 Stag £1,000 Matchplay, Stanley Motors 1,000 Guineas Tournament, Transvaal Open, East Rand Open, South Africa Professional, South African Open, Dunlop Masters £1,000 Tournament
1952 Stag £1,000 Matchplay, Stanley Motors 1,000 Guineas Tournament
1953 SANTA Open, Natal Open
1954 SANTA Open, Transvaal Open, Mills 1,000 Guineas Tournament
1955 Transvaal Open, South African Open, South Africa Professional
1956 Western Province Open
1957 East Rand Open
1958 Transvaal Open, Western Province Open, East Rand Open (tie with Eric Moore)
1960 East Rand Open

Other wins (29)
1938 Irish Open, New Zealand Open
1939 Dutch Open
1946 Yorkshire Evening News Tournament, Brand-Lochryn Tournament, Dunlop Masters
1947 Carolinas Open, Carolinas PGA Championship
1948 Carolinas Open
1950 Dunlop Tournament, Spalding Tournament, North British-Harrogate Tournament
1952 French Open, Mexican Open, Lotus Tournament, Carolinas Open
1953 French Open
1954 Egyptian Open, German Open, Swiss Open, Dunlop Tournament, Dunlop British Masters (tie with Jimmy Adams), Egyptian Match Play, Swallow-Harrogate Tournament (Stroke play stage)
1955 Australian Open
1957 Daks Tournament, Bowmaker Tournament (tied with Frank Jowle)
1959 New Hampshire Open, Bowmaker Tournament

Major championships

Wins (4)

1 Defeated Harry Bradshaw in 36-hole playoff: Locke (135), Bradshaw (147)

Results timeline

NT = No tournament
LA = Low amateur
CUT = missed the half-way cut
WD = Withdrew
"T" indicates a tie for a place

Sources: 1936 Amateur Championship, 1937 Amateur Championship

Summary

Most consecutive cuts made – 19 (1936 Open Championship – 1952 Masters)
Longest streak of top-10s – 5 (1949 U.S. Open – 1951 Open Championship)

Team appearances
South African Amateur Golf Team to England 1937.
Canada Cup (representing South Africa): 1953, 1954, 1956, 1960
Slazenger Trophy (representing British Commonwealth and Empire): 1956
Hopkins Trophy (representing Canada): 1952, 1953, 1954

See also
List of golfers with most PGA Tour wins
List of men's major championships winning golfers

References

External links

South African male golfers
Sunshine Tour golfers
PGA Tour golfers
Winners of men's major golf championships
World Golf Hall of Fame inductees
South African Air Force officers
South African World War II pilots
South African people of British descent
Sportspeople from Germiston
Golfers from Johannesburg
1917 births
1987 deaths